A road trip is a journey on roads.

Road Trip, Road trip, or Roadtrip  may also refer to:

Film 
 Road Trip (film), a 2000 comedy film
 Road Trip (soundtrack)
 Road Trip (2013 film) or A Mother's Rage, an American television film

Games 
 Road Trip, one of the Choro Q video games
 ModNation Racers: Road Trip (2012), a kart racing game developed for the PlayStation Vita

Music

Albums 
 Road Trip (Duane Eddy album), 2011
 Road Trip (Girl Authority album), 2007
 Road Trips (Grateful Dead), a series of live concert CDs by the Grateful Dead

Songs 
 "Road Trip" (song), by De Vet Du, 2017
 "Road Trip", by The Fireman from Electric Arguments, 2008
 "Road Trip", by Ninja Sex Party from Attitude City, 2015
 "Roadtrip", by Steriogram from Schmack!, 2004
 "Roadtrip", by Dream, 2021
 "Road Trip", by The D.E.s, 2008

Television 
 Road Trip (TV series), a 2017 Philippine TV show on GMA

Episodes
 "The Road Trip" (Brooklyn Nine-Nine)
 "Road Trip" (Father of the Pride)
 "Road Trip" (Parks and Recreation)
 "Road Trip" (SpongeBob SquarePants)
 "Road Trip" (Teen Titans Go!)
 "Road Trip", an episode of season 3 of Phineas and Ferb

See also 
 The Great American Road Trip, a 2009 reality show
 Road movies, film genre